Balta is a genus of cockroaches in the sub family Pseudophyllodromiinae. Found in Asia, Africa, Australia and Oceania. The genus was created in 1893 by Johann Tepper.

Species
These species belong to the genus Balta:

 Balta acutiventris <small>(Chopard, 1924)</small>
 Balta amplior (Hebard, 1943)
 Balta arborescens  (Hanitsch, 1930)
 Balta athertonae  (Hebard, 1943)
 Balta aurea  (Hanitsch, 1928)
 Balta barbellata  (Che & Chen, 2010)
  Balta bicolor  (Hebard, 1943)
 Balta bilobata  (Hanitsch, 1928)
 Balta brunnea  (Chopard, 1924)
 Balta caledonica  (Chopard, 1924)
 Balta camerunensis  (Shelford, 1908)
 Balta chopardi  (Princis, 1969)
 Balta similis  (Chopard, 1924)
 Balta crassivenosa  (Bolívar, 1924)
 Balta curvidens  (Hebard, 1943)
 Balta curvirostris  Che & Chen, 2010
 Balta denticauda  Hebard, 1943
 Balta dissecta  Che & Wang, 2010
 Balta epilamproides  Tepper, 1893
 Balta fragilis  Hebard, 1943
 Balta francquii  Princis, 1969
 Balta fratercula  Hebard, 1943
 Balta gemmicula  Hebard, 1943
 Balta globifera  (Hanitsch, 1933)
 Balta godeffroyi  (Shelford, 1911)
 Balta gracilipes  (Chopard, 1924)
 Balta grandis  (Chopard, 1924)
 Balta granulosa  (Hanitsch, 1933)
 Balta hebardi  Princis, 1969
 Balta heterostylata  Princis, 1957
 Balta hwangorum  Bey-Bienko, 1958
 Balta ikonnikovi  (Bey-Bienko, 1941)
 Balta inermis  (Princis, 1963)
 Balta innotabilis  (Walker, 1871)
 Balta conspicienda  (Bolívar, 1895)
 Balta insignis  (Shelford, 1910)
 Balta jacobsoni  (Hebard, 1929)
 Balta jinlinorum  Che & Wang, 2010
 Balta komodensis  Bey-Bienko, 1965
 Balta kurandae  Hebard, 1943
 Balta litura  (Tepper, 1896)
 Balta livida  (Princis, 1963)
 Balta longealata  (Hanitsch, 1930)
 Balta longicercata  (Bolívar, 1924)
 Balta luteicosta  Hebard, 1943
 Balta luzonica  (Bey-Bienko, 1941)
 Balta minuta  (Chopard, 1924)
 Balta montaguei  (Chopard, 1924)
 Balta mundicola  (Walker, 1868)
 Balta nebulosa  (Hebard, 1943)
 Balta nigrolineata  (Stål, 1877)
 Balta notulata  (Stål, 1860)
 Balta pallidula  (Hebard, 1943)
 Balta papua  (Saussure & Zehntner, 1895)
 Balta parvula  (Bolívar, 1924)
 Balta patula  (Walker, 1869)
 Balta perpallida  Hebard, 1943
 Balta perscripta  Hebard, 1943
 Balta personata  Hebard, 1943
 Balta picea  Bey-Bienko, 1958
 Balta praestans  Hebard, 1943
 Balta pulchella  Hebard, 1943
 Balta punctuligera  Hebard, 1943
 Balta quadricaudata  Hebard, 1943
 Balta ramifera  (Walker, 1871)
 Balta reticulata  (Fabricius, 1798)
 Balta rouxi  (Chopard, 1924)
 Balta ruficeps  (Kirby, 1900)
 Balta sarasini  (Chopard, 1924)
 Balta scripta  (Shelford, 1911)
 Balta serraticauda  Hebard, 1943
 Balta setifera  (Hanitsch, 1929)
 Balta siccifolia  (Hanitsch, 1932)
 Balta signata  Bey-Bienko, 1965
 Balta similis  (Saussure, 1869)
 Balta spinea  Che & Chen, 2010
 Balta spinescens  Che & Wang, 2010
 Balta spuria  (Wattenwyl, 1865)
 Balta stylata  Hebard, 1943
 Balta testacea  (Tepper, 1896)
 Balta toowoomba  Hebard, 1943
 Balta torresiana  Hebard, 1943
 Balta translucida  (Shelford, 1908)
 Balta transversa  Hebard, 1943
 Balta tricolor  (Hanitsch, 1934)
 Balta unicolor  (Chopard, 1929)
 Balta uvarovi  (Chopard, 1924)
 Balta variegata  (Hanitsch, 1933)
 Balta ventralis  Hebard, 1943
 Balta verticalis  Hebard, 1943
 Balta vicina  (Wattenwyl), 1893)
 Balta vilis  (Wattenwyl), 1865)
 Balta yorkensis''  Hebard, 1943

References

Cockroach genera